Spring Valley High School is located in the Spring Valley community in unincorporated Clark County, Nevada, United States. The school, serving grades 9 through 12, is a part of the Clark County School District. The school's mascot is a grizzly bear.  The school's curriculum offers 8 Career/Technical Education Programs and an International Baccalaureate Diploma.  Their sports rivals are Durango High School, Sierra Vista High School, and Bonanza High School. The principal/ IB Head of School, Tara Powell, was appointed in June of 2021.

International Baccalaureate
Spring Valley High School offers IB as a magnet program. It is an authorized International Baccalaureate Middle Year and Diploma Program World School. It also offers the IB Career Path program. The Middle Years program is wall to wall in the 9th and 10th grade. The inaugural class of IB DP graduated in May 2020. Approximately 50% of the candidates earned the IB diploma that year.

AVID
Spring Valley HS is an AVID (Advancement Via Individual Determination) National Demonstration School. Spring Valley has the largest AVID program in Nevada and is the only Demonstration school in the state. Spring Valley opened with its first group of AVID students who graduated in 2008. AVID is an elective college prep program which helps students prepare for college and life. AVID's mission is to close the achievement gap by preparing all students for college readiness and success in a global society.

Athletics

Nevada Interscholastic Activities Association State Championships

Girls Basketball - 2014
Softball - 2016
Bowling - 2018, 2019
Cheerleading- 2014- 2020

Notable alumni
Tyler Anderson, baseball player, Los Angeles Dodgers
Gary Payton II, basketball player, Golden State Warriors
Aaron Blair, baseball player, San Francisco Giants

Feeder Schools
Clifford J. Lawrence Junior High School
Victoria Fertitta Middle School
Walter Johnson Junior High School
Kenny Guinn Middle School

References

External links

Clark County School District
Educational institutions established in 2004
High schools in Clark County, Nevada
School buildings completed in 2004
2004 establishments in Nevada
Public high schools in Nevada
Buildings and structures in Spring Valley, Nevada